Výrava is a village and municipality in the Medzilaborce District in the Prešov Region of far north-eastern Slovakia.

History
In historical records the village was first mentioned in 1557.

Geography
The municipality lies at an altitude of 368 metres and covers an area of 20.243 km². It has a population of about 160 people.

Gallery

References

External links
 
 
https://web.archive.org/web/20071217080336/http://www.statistics.sk/mosmis/eng/run.html 

Villages and municipalities in Medzilaborce District